Lalgudi Gopala Jayaraman Radhakrishnan, popularly known as G. J. R. Krishnan or Lalgudi Krishnan,  is a  Carnatic violinist, vocalist and composer. He is the son and disciple of the legendary maestro Lalgudi G. Jayaraman. Over the years, Krishnan has nurtured and propagated the legacy of the Lalgudi Bani, while also blending his own artistic elements. His style is defined by technique, bhava, laya, and a philosophical adherence to the notion that the violin must closely mimic the human voice. Lalgudi Krishnan was awarded with the Sangeet Natak Akademi Award in 2015. This is the highest Indian recognition given to people in the field of performing arts. Along with his sister, Lalgudi Vijayalakshmi, the duo was honored with the prestigious Sangita Kalanidhi award from the Madras Music Academy in 2022. This is considered the highest accolade in the field of Carnatic music.

Early life and background

Lalgudi Krishnan was born to violin maestro Lalgudi Jayaraman and Rajalakshmi.

Though a post graduate in commerce and a cost and works accountant and a company secretary education, Krishnan has dedicated his life to a career in music.

Career

Lalgudi G. J. R. Krishnan debuted in 1973. His style, like his father's, is the gayaka style closest to vocal rendition. He travels extensively on musical tours all over the world.

 G J R Krishnan typically performs duets with his sister, Lalgudi Vijayalakshmi, a violin Vidushi. 
 G J R Krishnan's world tours include performances
 Lincoln Center, New york
 a symphony, "Sunada Pravaham" (June 2004-conducted by G J R Krishnan) at the Singapore Arts Festival
 Tropical Institute of Amsterdam
 Concertgebouw-Amsterdam for the Indo Amsterdam Festival
 Smithsonian Institution-Washington, USA
 India festival in the erstwhile USSR
 Purcell Room, London

Awards
Awards Krishnan has won include:

 2022- Sangita Kalanidhi from the Madras Music Academy.
 2017- 8th Indira Sivasailam Endowment Medal from the Indira Sivasailam Foundation and the Music Academy, Chennai
 2015 - Sangeet Natak Academi Award
 2009 - Sangeetha Kalasagara Award from Kalasagaram (conferred at the 42nd Annual Cultural Festival of Music,Dance & Drama)
 2006 - Kalaimamani from the Tamil Nadu Iyal Isai Nataka Mandram, Government of Tamil Nadu
 1998 - Kalki Krishnamurthy Memorial Award, the Kalki Krishnamurthy Centenary year from the Kalki Krishnamurthy Memorial Trust
 1998 - Sangeetha Choodamani award conferred by Sri Krishna Gana Sabha, Chennai,
 1986 - Best Violinist Award from the Music Academy, Chennai

Discography
 Bow to the violins

References

Indian violinists
Carnatic composers
Tamil musicians
1960 births
Living people
21st-century violinists
Recipients of the Sangeet Natak Akademi Award